Our Day is a silent documentary short directed by Wallace Kelly in 1938, about a day in the life of the Kelly family in Lebanon, Kentucky. It starred his mother, wife, brother, pet cat and dog, and Wallace himself. It countered the contemporary stereotypes of impoverished Southerners eking out a living during the Depression by documenting a modern home with adults with sophisticated interests.

Our Day was selected for the National Film Registry by the Librarian of Congress in 2007 as "culturally, historically, or aesthetically significant".

References

External links
Our Day essay  by Margaret Compton on the National Film Registry website 

 
 Our Day essay by Daniel Eagan in America's Film Legacy: The Authoritative Guide to the Landmark Movies in the National Film Registry, A&C Black, 2010 , pages 279-280 

1938 documentary films
1938 films
American short documentary films
American silent short films
Black-and-white documentary films
1930s short documentary films
United States National Film Registry films
Documentary films about families
Films shot in Kentucky
Films set in Kentucky
Lebanon, Kentucky
American black-and-white films
Documentary films about Kentucky
1930s American films